Virgil Roy Misidjan (born 24 July 1993), nicknamed Vura as worn on his shirt, is a Dutch professional footballer who plays as a winger for FC Twente in the Eredivisie.

Career

Early career
Born in Goirle, part of the suburban area of the city of Tilburg, Misidjan began his football career at Willem II.

Willem II
In early 2012, Misidjan returned to Willem II and helped the team gain promotion to the Eredivisie, finishing the season with 6 goals in 14 matches. He made his first team debut in a 1–0 away loss against Den Bosch on 29 January 2012, coming on as a substitute.

Ludogorets Razgrad

On 16 August 2013, Misidjan joined Bulgarian side Ludogorets Razgrad for a reported fee of €700,000. He was given the number 93 jersey. He made his debut on the following day, in a 1–0 away win over Lokomotiv Plovdiv, coming on as a second-half substitute. In the group phase of 2013–14 UEFA Europa League, Misidjan scored two goals in the matches against PSV Eindhoven. He also scored twice in the 2016–17 UEFA Champions League play-offs against Viktoria Plzeň, helping Ludogorets to qualify for the group phase. On 6 December 2016, he scored his maiden goal in the groups of the tournament, giving his side a 1–0 lead in a 2–2 draw in the away match against Paris Saint-Germain.

On 21 October 2017, he extended his contract with the team until 30 June 2020.

1. FC Nürnberg
On 31 August 2018, the last day of the 2018 summer transfer window, Misidjan joined 1. FC Nürnberg.

PEC Zwolle
In January 2021, he returned to the Netherlands, signing a six-month contract with PEC Zwolle.

FC Twente
In June 2021, he signed for FC Twente on a two-year deal.

International career
Misidjan received a call up for Netherlands U20 in 2013 and played in a friendly match against Serbia U21 on 22 March 2013, coming as a substitute at halftime in place of Guus Hupperts.

In 2014 Misidjan declined to play for Suriname. In December 2017 the ex Ludogorets manager Georgi Dermendzhiev hinted that Vura could potentially play for Bulgaria after August 2018.

Personal life
Misidjan received a suspended 58-day prison sentence and was ordered to perform 240 hours of community service after he was convicted of assault for a January 2018 Roosendaal parking lot altercation with a 68-year-old man.

Career statistics

Club

Honours
RKC Waalwijk
Eerste Divisie: 2010–11

Ludogorets
 Bulgarian A Group/First League: 2013–14; 2014–15, 2015–16, 2016–17, 2017–18
 Bulgarian Cup: 2013–14
 Bulgarian Supercup: 2014, 2018

References

External links
 
 Voetbal International 

1993 births
Living people
People from Goirle
Association football wingers
Dutch footballers
Netherlands youth international footballers
Dutch sportspeople of Surinamese descent
Willem II (football club) players
PFC Ludogorets Razgrad players
PFC Ludogorets Razgrad II players
1. FC Nürnberg players
PEC Zwolle players
FC Twente players
Eredivisie players
Eerste Divisie players
First Professional Football League (Bulgaria) players
Bundesliga players
2. Bundesliga players
Expatriate footballers in Bulgaria
Dutch expatriate footballers
Dutch expatriate sportspeople in Bulgaria
Dutch expatriate sportspeople in Germany
Expatriate footballers in Germany
Footballers from North Brabant